Halfway River First Nation is a Dunneza First Nations government with a 3988 ha reserve located 75 km northwest of Fort St. John, British Columbia. It is a Treaty 8 nation.

The Halfway River people were at one point part of the "Hudson Hope Indian Band" but in 1971 they split off, and the remaining people formed  West Moberly First Nations. As of January 2008, there were 235 registered members, with 132 living on the reserve.

The current chief is Darlene Hunter (replacing Russell Lily in December 2013) and the current councillors are Coleen Achla, and Amanda Metecheah.

History

Past Chiefs and Councils
Chief Darlene Hunter (2013–present) with Coleen Achla and Amanda Metecheah
Chief Russell Lily (2011–2013) with Coleen Achla and William Field
Chief Ed Whitford (2008–2011)

References

External links
Halfway River First Nation
Halfway River at the Treaty 8 Tribal Council.
AANDC profile

Dane-zaa
First Nations governments in British Columbia
Peace River Country